Celada de Cea is a locality and minor local entity located in the municipality of Sahagún, in León province, Castile and León, Spain. As of 2020, it has a population of 24.

Geography 
Celada de Cea is located 69km east-southeast of León, Spain.

References

Populated places in the Province of León